Waiputrechus is a genus of beetles in the family Carabidae, containing a single species endemic to New Zealand. Waiputrechus cavernicola is known only from a single specimen collected in 1999 by Maree Hunt from a rocky wall inside a cave, Mert's Muddle, near Waipu. It has been classified as "nationally critical" under the New Zealand Threat Classification System.

Description 
Waiputrechus cavernicola is very small, the holotype specimen being 3.1 mm in length. It is a pale yellowish brown.

References

External links
 An image can be found on p66 of this document.

Trechinae
Monotypic Carabidae genera